Sergei Alekseyevich Golyatkin (born 4 May 1988) is a Russian former footballer.

He made his debut in the Russian Premier League in 2007 for FC Rubin Kazan.

External links
 
 
 

1988 births
People from Lukhovitsky District
Living people
Russian footballers
Association football defenders
Russian Premier League players
Russian expatriate footballers
Expatriate footballers in Poland
Russian expatriate sportspeople in Poland
Expatriate footballers in Belarus
FC Rubin Kazan players
FC Vityaz Podolsk players
FC Tom Tomsk players
FC Chernomorets Novorossiysk players
FC SKA-Khabarovsk players
Polonia Warsaw players
FC Tyumen players
FC Granit Mikashevichi players
FC Slutsk players
FC Neftekhimik Nizhnekamsk players
Sportspeople from Moscow Oblast